Erwinville is an unincorporated community and census-designated place in West Baton Rouge Parish, Louisiana, United States. Its population was 2,192 as of the 2010 census. U.S. Route 190 passes through the community.

Geography

Demographics 

As of the 2020 United States census, there were 2,275 people, 918 households, and 640 families residing in the CDP.

References

Unincorporated communities in West Baton Rouge Parish, Louisiana
Unincorporated communities in Louisiana
Census-designated places in West Baton Rouge Parish, Louisiana
Census-designated places in Louisiana